Roberto Cortés González (2 February 1905 – 30 August 1975) was a Chilean football goalkeeper. He was part of Chile's team at the 1928 Summer Olympics, but he did not play in any matches.

References

External links
 

1905 births
1975 deaths
Chilean footballers
Chile international footballers
Colo-Colo footballers
1930 FIFA World Cup players
Association football goalkeepers
Olympic footballers of Chile
Footballers at the 1928 Summer Olympics